The Nepal Rastra Bank (NRB) was established April 26, 1956 A.D. (Nepali Date: Baisakh 14, 2013 B.S.) under the Nepal Rastra Bank Act, 1955, to discharge the central banking responsibilities including guiding the development of the embryonic domestic financial sector. As of now, the NRB is functioning under the new Nepal Rastra Bank Act, 2002. functions of NRB are to formulate required monetary and foreign exchange policies so as to maintain the stability in market prices, to issue currency notes, to regulate and supervise the banking and financial sector, to develop efficient payment and banking systems among others. The NRB is also the economic advisor to the government of Nepal. As the central bank of Nepal, it is the monetary, supervisory and regulatory body of all the commercial banks. development banks, finance companies and micro-finances institutions. 

The central office is located in Baluwatar, Kathmandu and it has eight provincial offices, located at Biratnagar, Janakpur, Birgunj, Pokhara, Siddharthanagar, Nepalgunj, Surkhet and Dhangadhi.

NRB formulates and implements monetary policy. Nepal Rastra Bank also oversees foreign exchange rates and the country's foreign exchange reserves.  The NRB is one of the principal owners of the Nepal Stock Exchange.

It is a member of the Asian Clearing Union. The incumbent governor of Nepal Rastra Bank is CA Maha Prasad Adhikari while Dr. Gunakar Bhatta is the spokesperson.

History of Nepal Rastra Bank 

The central bank of Nepal, Nepal Rastra Bank, was in fact established only after 19 years of establishment of the first bank of Nepal in 1937, Nepal Bank Ltd. Before 1956, Nepal did not have its own foreign currency reserve but rather maintained it in central bank of India. For getting the foreign currency amounts required to bear the expenses of Nepali Embassy in London and health treatment expenses of King Tribhuvan, an application had to be submitted to the Reserve Bank of India.  One of the problems that distressed Nepalese economy was the circulation of two types of currency, Nepalese and Indian simultaneously.  Nepal had a dominant use of Indian rupee. Exchange rates between the Indian and Nepali currency were fixed by local traders. Seeing this as a dependence to India, King Mahendra , the son of King Tribhuvan established a central bank on April 26, 1956 in order to reduce dependence on India, replace Indian currency being circulated in the market and strengthen the countries' sovereignty by making Nepal independent in foreign currency exchange.

After its establishment, before operating accounts of any other banks in Nepal, Nepal Rastra bank opened its first bank account in the Reserve Bank of India. To open its bank account in Reserve Bank of India, the then Governor Himalaya Shumsher JB Rana sent a letter to then India’s secretary of economic affairs, Braj Kumar Nehru and in the direction of Nehru, the first account of NRB was opened there. Subsequently, NRB opened its account in another bank of India and then in one bank of London.

The early banknotes issued during the rule of King Tribhuvan were not circulated by a Central Bank but rather was initially held by His Majesty’s Government, then called the Government of Nepal, through the “Sadar Muluki khana” (Central Treasury) from September 1945 through February 1960  and were signed by a Kajanchi (head of the treasury). After, this the responsibility was handed over to the NRB. For this purpose, the NRB had set up the Note Department in September 1956 which was renamed as the Currency Management Department in November 2002. On Feb. 19, 1960, NRB released its first bank notes in the denomination of Mohru 1. The signature on the bank notes were replaced by the governors of central bank rather than the head of treasury in all bank notes issued in the country after this date.

Initially, the central bank of Nepal was founded under the Nepal Rastra Bank Act, 1955 which stated that the primary responsibility of the bank was to ensure “proper management for the issuance of the Nepalese currency notes”. Later, the Foreign Exchange Regulation Act, 1963 enacted,  NRB as the custodian of foreign exchange reserves of the country. Nepal’s choice for a fixed exchange rate with Indian Currency along with supporting government policies contributed significantly in stabilizing confidence in both the domestic currency and in exchange rate among the local traders. Additionally, during this decade, the national policy of relations with foreign institution were implemented which created the foundation for membership with international  organization such as the International Monetary Fund (IMF) and the World Bank (WB) in 1961. Because of these policies, Nepal Rastra bank succeeded in the circulation of the new Nepalese rupee as the legal tender in Nepal's Terai region which was predominated by Indian currencies and facilitated for the elimination of the dual currency period in 1964 in the country and making Nepal independent in foreign currency exchange. Before 1956, Nepal’s foreign exchange reserves were held in Indian banks. As of now, Nepal’s foreign exchange reserves are held by the NRB itself. Only a certain percentage of foreign exchange reserves is held by other banks.

In 1974, NRB became the founding member Asian Clearing Union (ACU), with headquarters in Tehran, Iran. However this payment system does perform settlement for payment between Nepal and India.

The  financial sector reform based on the Financial Sector Strategy Paper that Government of Nepal publicly announced on 22 November 2000 enacted Nepal Rastra Bank Act, 2002 under which the bank is running till date. The act states its primary responsibility as “to take necessary decisions with regard to the denominations of bank notes and coins, the figures, size, metal, materials for printing notes and other materials, and to frame appropriate policies with regard to their issue. Under this act, NRB formulated its first monetary policy in the fiscal year 2002/03, 46 years after its establishment. The central bank has been formulating monetary policy every year since then to help in the implementation of the government’s annual policy and budget plan and to maintain financial stability.

Objectives of Nepal Rastra Bank [NRB] 
As per the Nepal Rastra Bank Act, 2002 Section 4(1) the objectives of the Bank shall be as follows:-

(a) To formulate necessary monetary and foreign exchange policies in order to maintain the stability of price and balance of payment for economic stability and sustainable development of economy, and manage it,

(b) To increase the access of the financial service and increase the public confidence towards the banking and financial system by maintaining stability of the banking and financial sectors,

(c) To develop a secure, healthy and efficient system of payment;

Functions of Nepal Rastra Bank 
(a) To issue bank notes and coins;

(b) To formulate necessary monetary policies in order to maintain price stability and to implement or cause to implement them,

(c) To formulate foreign exchange policies and to implement or cause to implement them,

(d) To determine the system of foreign exchange rate,

(e) To manage and operate foreign exchange reserve,

(f) To issue license to commercial banks and financial institutions to carry on banking and financial business and to regulate, inspect, supervise and monitor such transactions,

(g) To act as a banker, advisor and financial agent of Government of Nepal,

(h) To act as the banker of commercial banks and financial institutions and to function as the lender of the last resort,

(i) To establish and promote the system of payment, clearing and settlement and to regulate these activities,

(j) To operate open market transaction through necessary instruments for liquidity management,

(k) To implement or cause to implement any other necessary functions which the Bank has to carry out in order to achieve the objectives of the Bank under NRB Act, 2002.

Former Governors

Board of Directors 
As per the Nepal Rastra Bank Act, 2002, Nepal Rastra Bank Board of Directors has seven members. The Governor of the bank chairs the Board of Directors. The Governor, Deputy Governors and other Directors are appointed by the Government of Nepal (Council of Ministers) for a term of five years. The Government may reappoint the retiring Governor for one additional term.

Branches and support bodies 

The NRB has its head office in Kathmandu. The central bank’s office in Province 1 is based in Biratnagar while its based in Janakpur in Province 2. Its office in Bagmati province is in Birgunj. The provincial office in Birgunj looks after the province. Gandaki province’s office of the central bank is in Pokhara.

Province 5 has two provincial offices with one based in Nepalgunj and another in Siddharthanagar (Rupandehi). Surkhet office serves as the provincial office for Karnali while Dhangadhi serves Sudur Paschim province.

Department, Office, Division & Unit 
These are the current division of NRB.

 Economic Research Department
 Banks and Financial Institutions Regulation Department
 Foreign Exchange Management Department
 Currency Management Department
 Assets and Service Management Department
 Financial Management Department
 Human Resources Management Department
 Internal Audit Department
 Monetary Management Department
 Bank Supervision Department
 Financial Institution Supervision Department
 Microfinance Institutions Supervision Department 
 Non-Bank Financial Institution Supervision Department
 Corporate Planning and Risk Management Department
 Information Technology Department
 Payment Systems Department
 Banking Department
 Office of the Governor
 Legal Division
 Financial Information Unit

Publications 
A report titled "Current Macro-Economic and Financial Situation" is published monthly, as required by the Nepal Rastra Bank Act, 2002. The report sums up trends and developments throughout the financial sector. Starting in 2004, the central Bank of Nepal publishes Economic Bulletin every three months. It also publishes yearly report since 2003 according to the Nepal Rastra Bank Act, 2002. Since 1987 , the central bank has been releasing journal named economic review citing the research done on various economic and financial fields of the country. It also published monthly,, quarterly and yearly newsletters. On special occasion such as anniversary, NRB also releases special data citing history, trends, future etc. NRB also performs various research which it publishes regularly.

References

External links 

Central banks
Banks of Nepal
Banks established in 1956
1956 establishments in Nepal
Regulatory agencies of Nepal